Malcolm MacDonald (1901–1981) was a British politician and diplomat.

Malcolm (or Malky) MacDonald (or Macdonald, McDonald) may also refer to:
Malcolm MacDonald (Canadian politician) (1836–1902), Canadian politician and ship owner
Malcolm Archibald Macdonald (1875–1941), Canadian judge and politician
Malky MacDonald (1913–1999), Scottish-born footballer and manager who played for Celtic, Kilmarnock and Brentford
Malcolm MacDonald (composer) (1916–1992), British composer
Malcolm MacDonald (music critic) (1948–2014), music critic and author
Malcolm Macdonald (born 1950), English international footballer who played for Luton, Newcastle United and Arsenal
Malcolm MacDonald (baseball) (1872–1946), outfielder in Major League Baseball
Malcolm McDonald (academic), British educator
Malcolm MacDonald (tennis) (1865–1921), American Olympic tennis player
Malcolm Macdonald (engineer) (born 1978), Scottish space engineer and academic
Callum Macdonald (1912–1999), also known as Malcolm Macdonald, Scottish printer and publisher